Vodien Internet Solutions is a provider of web hosting services, headquartered in Singapore. Its range of services include shared hosting, virtual private servers, dedicated web hosting, email hosting, and reseller web hosting.

History 
Vodien Internet Solutions was founded in 2002, and was then registered as a sole proprietorship under the business name of Vodien Studios. Alvin Poh and John Jervis Lee, the founders of Vodien, started the company off providing graphic design, web design and web development services.

From 2005 to 2007, Vodien underwent a company restructuring that saw the removal of several business functions and services. In August 2005, Vodien Studios renamed itself Vodien Internet Solutions to signify the change in its core business, and to differentiate itself from its previous entity. In the upcoming months, Vodien started purchasing infrastructure and equipment, and began to specialise in the web hosting services area.

On July 30, 2009, the Accounting and Corporate Regulatory Authority of Singapore approved the incorporation of Vodien Internet Solutions Pte Ltd, a registered private limited company that retained the name of the sole proprietorship.

In 2017, Vodien Internet Solutions and all related companies and businesses were acquired for $29.67 million by Dreamscape Networks.

In May 2018, Vodien acquired Webvisions, the shared hosting division of ICONZ-Webvisions (iWV), making it responsible for over 35,000 companies and 210,000 users.

Corporate governance 

As of 2019, Vodien's board of directors includes:

 Alvin Poh
 John Jervis Lee

Customers 
Vodien has an international clientele, and serves customers coming from countries such as Singapore, Malaysia, Indonesia, Netherlands, Switzerland, the United Kingdom, and the United States. As of November 16, 2009, Vodien hosts more than 1,000 domains and has a market share of 1.2501% (domestic) and 0.0014% (global). In 2014, Vodien grew to 14,534 domains, growing its market share to 12.4622% (domestic) and 0.0107% (global).

Accreditations 

Vodien is an Internet Service Provider that owns IP space allocated by APNIC, one of five Regional Internet Registries (RIRs) charged with ensuring the distribution and management of IP addresses and related resources. These resources are required for the stable and reliable operation of the global Internet. As of 2009, Vodien is an accredited member of APNIC.

In 2014, Vodien became an ICANN accredited registrar. Being an accredited registrar allows Vodien to partner and work directly with various global domain name registries to provide domain name registrations of domain names such as .aero, .asia, .biz, .cat, .com, .coop, .info, .jobs, .mobi, .museum, .name, .net, .org, .pro, .tel, .travel, .xxx.

Following the ICANN accreditation, Vodien became an SGNIC accredited registrar in 2015.

References 

Companies established in 2002
Information technology companies of Singapore
2002 establishments in Singapore
Web hosting